The Diet of Speyer or the Diet of Spires (sometimes referred to as Speyer V) was an Imperial Diet of the Holy Roman Empire which took place in 1570 in the Imperial City of Speyer (also known as  Spires, in present-day Germany).

Diet 
The Diet decided to allow printing only in free imperial cities, residences and university towns. This was a measure to exert tighter control (censorship) in the struggle against the spread of the Protestant Reformation.

The Diet also decided to return part of the land confiscated from Elector John Frederick II of Saxony to his children  John Casimir (who received the Coburg area) and  John Ernest (who received the Eisenach area).

The Diet also agreed to the Treaty of Speyer (1570) in which King John II Sigismund Zápolya abdicated as King of Hungary in favor of Emperor  Maximilian II.  John became Prince of Transylvania.

Speyer
Speyer
1570 in the Holy Roman Empire
1570 in politics
Maximilian II, Holy Roman Emperor